Skånevik Church is a parish church of the Church of Norway in Etne Municipality in Vestland county, Norway. It is located in the village of Skånevik. It is one of the churches for the Skånevik parish which is part of the Sunnhordland prosti (deanery) in the Diocese of Bjørgvin. The white, wooden church was built in a long church design in 1900 using plans drawn up by the architect Hartvig Sverdrup Eckhoff. The church seats about 400 people.

History

The earliest existing historical records of the church date back to the year 1340, but the church was not new at that time. An inspection report from 1664 states that the old church was very dilapidated and in poor condition. Throughout the 1660s, the roof was repaired a little by little each year to help save the church, but planning soon began for a new church. In 1674, the church was damaged by a large storm. In 1682–1683, the old church was torn down and replaced by a new timber-framed long church on the same site. The new church was built by Olle Bysemb and Erich Fyllingsnes.

In 1814, this church served as an election church. Together with more than 300 other parish churches across Norway, it was a polling station for elections to the 1814 Norwegian Constituent Assembly which wrote the Constitution of Norway. This was Norway's first national elections. Each church parish was a constituency that elected people called "electors" who later met together in each county to elect the representatives for the assembly that was to meet in Eidsvoll later that year.

The building was remodeled in 1857. The new church was designed by Hartvig Sverdrup Eckhoff. The new church was consecrated on 31 August 1900. A few months after the new church was completed, the older church was demolished.

See also
List of churches in Bjørgvin

References

Etne
Churches in Vestland
Long churches in Norway
Wooden churches in Norway
20th-century Church of Norway church buildings
Churches completed in 1900
13th-century establishments in Norway
Norwegian election church